Najadales is the botanical name of an order of flowering plants. A well-known system that used this name is the Cronquist system (1981), which used this name for an order in subclass Alismatidae with this circumscription:

 order Najadales
 family Aponogetonaceae
 family Scheuchzeriaceae
 family Juncaginaceae
 family Potamogetonaceae
 family Ruppiaceae
 family Najadaceae
 family Zannichelliaceae
 family Posidoniaceae
 family Cymodoceaceae
 family Zosteraceae

The APG II system, used here, assigns the plants involved to the expanded order Alismatales, in the clade 'monocots'.

References

Historically recognized angiosperm orders